Alejandro Roberto Gavatorta (born 21 March 1980 in Gálvez, Santa Fe) is an Argentine retired football midfielder.

References

External links
 Alejandro Gavatorta – Argentine Primera statistics at Fútbol XXI  
Alejandro Gavatorta at BDFA.com.ar 
 
 

1980 births
Living people
Argentine footballers
Club Atlético Colón footballers
Expatriate footballers in Romania
Liga I players
FC Politehnica Iași (1945) players
AEK Larnaca FC players
Association football midfielders
Sportspeople from Santa Fe Province